The Delaware United States Senate election for 1797 was held on January 6, 1797. Henry Latimer defeated the future governor of Delaware David Hall by 10 votes.

Results

References

Delaware
1797
1797 Delaware elections